Parkhouse may refer to:

People
Adam Parkhouse (born 1992), Australian footballer
Annie Parkhouse, British comics artist
Gilbert Parkhouse (1925–2000), Welsh cricketer
George Parkhouse (1900–1967), American politician
Jaynie Parkhouse (born 1956), New Zealand swimmer
Richard Parkhouse (1910–1984), Welsh cricketer
Steve Parkhouse, British comics artist

Other uses
Ayr Parkhouse F.C., a defunct Scottish football club
Parkhouse, Glasgow G22, a neighbourhood in the north of Glasgow, Scotland
Possilpark & Parkhouse railway station, serving the above community
Parkhouse, Glasgow G53, another Glasgow neighbourhood (south side near Nitshill)
Parkhouse Halt railway station, a closed railway station in Cumbria, England
Parkhouse Hill, a natural feature in Derbyshire, England

See also 
 Park House (disambiguation)